The BARC 200 was an annual motor race organised by the British Automobile Racing Club from 1954 to 1984. it was a revival of the pre-war 200 mile races organised at Brooklands and Donington Park by the BARC's predecessor, the Junior Car Club, and inspired by the construction of the new motor racing circuit at Aintree.

The first event took place on 29 May 1954 as a Formula Libre race and was won by Stirling Moss in a Maserati 250F. Subsequent races at Aintree took place either as a Formula One or mixed Formula One/Formula Two event, with Moss winning on a further three occasions and Jack Brabham winning twice.

Racing at Aintree was scaled back to club-level racing following the 1964 race and, after being scheduled (and twice being cancelled due to the vagaries of British spring weather) variously at Silverstone and Oulton Park, the event moved in 1968 to be a permanent fixture at Thruxton. By now it was a purely Formula Two event, counting as a round of the European Formula Two Championship. Future Formula One World Champion Jochen Rindt won the race four times in succession, leading to a subsequent trophy being awarded in his name.

Winners of the BARC 200

References

Motorsport in the United Kingdom